Revolution is the second studio album and second Korean material release by South Korean girl group Kara, released digitally on July 30, 2009, and physically on July 31, 2009, by DSP. The album was the band's first regular release to be recorded under the second line-up, featuring members Goo Hara and Kang Jiyoung, who replaced Kim Sunghee after her withdrawal in 2008.

Background and promotion
The lead single "Wanna" was released on July 28, 2009, ahead of the album's official release. The music video was released on July 29, with the full album being available on July 30.  Promotional activities commenced on July 31, beginning with KBS's Music Bank; the group performed both "Wanna" and "Mister". After their performance aired, "Mister" proved to be popular with viewers due to a "butt dance" that is featured prominently in the choreography.

On August 30, 2009, "Wanna" won the "Mutizen Song" award from SBS's Inkigayo music program.

Due to the overwhelming response that "Mister" received, Kara's overall popularity increased, with numerous advertisement requests coming in for the group; they had more advertisements in October 2009 than the previous two years.

Commercial performance 
The Gaon Music Chart was launched in February 2010 as the official chart for South Korea. The album entered at number 37 on the Gaon Album Chart for the second week of 2010 and peaked at number 3 for the week ending June 26, 2010. The album spent four non-consecutive weeks in Top 10 and became their fourth Top 10 album. The album has sold 80,645 copies as of 2011.

Track listing

Ddokateun Mam

"Ddok Gateun Mam" ("", "Same Heart" or "The Same Mind") was used in a mobile game called "i-Musician". It was released on June 2, 2009, and was later included on the album Revolution.

Charts

Weekly charts

References

External links
i-Musician Homepage

2009 albums
Kara (South Korean group) albums